Breteuil-Embranchement is a railway station on the Paris-Nord - Lille line located in the commune of Bacouël in the Oise department, France. It is surrounded by a hamlet also named Breteuil-Embranchement.

The station is served by TER Hauts-de-France trains.

An underground walkway allows passengers to cross the tracks, but makes the station inaccessible to the handicapped. The station has an unused freight storage building and sidings.

As the station name indicates, there was formerly a short branch line from here to Breteuil-sur-Noye, which had been passed by when the line from Paris Nord to Lille was constructed.

Gallery

See also
List of SNCF stations in Hauts-de-France

References

Railway stations in Oise
Railway stations in France opened in 1846